Disfear is a Swedish crust punk band that formed in the early 1990s and recorded sporadically over the years. After releasing the albums Soul Scars in 1995 and Everyday Slaughter in 1997, the group did not release another album until 2003 with a 12-track album, Misanthropic Generation, featuring vocalist Tomas Lindberg of At the Gates and The Great Deceiver and Uffe Cederlund of Entombed. They later worked with Converge's Kurt Ballou for their album Live the Storm.

Bassist Henke Frykman died of cancer on 25 March 2011.

Influences 
Tomas Lindberg has cited The Ramones, AC/DC, Motörhead, The Wipers, The Dead Boys, The Stooges, Jerry's Kids, Articles of Faith, and Uniform Choice as musical influences, as well as Michel Foucault as a conceptual influence. Other bands mentioned as inspirational include Discharge, Entombed, Turbonegro, Zeke, and Anti Cimex.

Members 
Current members
 Björn Peterson – guitar (1989–present)
 Tomas Lindberg – vocals (1998–present)
 Marcus Andersson – drums (1998–present)
 Ulf Cederlund – guitar (2004–present)
 Andreas Axelsson – bass (2014–present)

Former members
 Henke Frykman – bass (1989–2011; died 2011)
 Jeppe Lerjerud – vocals (1989–1998)
 Jan Axelsson – drums (1989)
 Jallo Lehto – drums (1989–1995)
 Robin Wiberg – drums (1995–1998)

Discography 
Disfear (1992)
A Brutal Sight of War (1993)
Disfear/Uncurbed split EP (1993)
Soul Scars (1995)
Everyday Slaughter (1997)
In Defence of Our Future, tribute to Discharge, contributing the song "Realities of War" (2001)
Misanthropic Generation (2003)
Powerload (2003; 7", Throne Records)
Split with ZEKE (2004; 7", Relapse Records)
Live the Storm (2008)
Split with Doomriders (2008)

References

External links 

Swedish crust and d-beat groups
Relapse Records artists